Cafe Azul was a Mexican restaurant in Portland, Oregon's Pearl District, in the United States.

History
Sisters Claire and Shawna Archibald opened the restaurant in McMinnville, Oregon, in 1994. The business was relocated to northwest Portland's Pearl District in 1998. The restaurant closed in 2004.

Reception
Gourmet named Cafe Azul one of the 50 best restaurants in the United States. Claire Archibald earned a James Beard nomination in 2003 for her work. Danielle Centoni included Cafe Azul in Eater Portland 2014 list of the city's "most missed" restaurants, writing, "Chef Claire Archibald's Mexican spot Cafe Azul is now looked upon as 'ahead of its time' for its upscale-authentic approach to Oaxacan cooking, and many readers are still nostalgic."

See also

 Hispanics and Latinos in Portland, Oregon
 List of defunct restaurants of the United States
 List of Mexican restaurants

References

1994 establishments in Oregon
2004 disestablishments in Oregon
Defunct Mexican restaurants in the United States
Defunct Latin American restaurants in Portland, Oregon
McMinnville, Oregon
Mexican restaurants in Portland, Oregon
Pearl District, Portland, Oregon
Restaurants disestablished in 2004
Restaurants established in 1994